Jangir Agha (c. 1874–1943) was a prominent military and social figure of Armenia in the early 20th century. He is considered a national hero of the Yazidi people. He died in prison after bing arrested during the Great Purge in 1938; he was posthumously rehabilitated.

He was born in Çubuklu village of Van Province of Turkey. A number of songs are written about Jangir Agha by the Yazidis.

Around 1909, Jangir Agha met with Andranik, the champion of Armenian independence from the Ottoman Empire. Jangir Agha supported the Armenian loyalists, providing them with military and material aid.

During the First World War, he was the commander of the irregular cavalry as a tribal leader. At the beginning of the war, Jangir Agha's First Nodist Yezidi regiment tried not to engage in combat operations against the Russian army. In 1915, after the capture of Van by the Russian army, Jangir Agha with his regiment and four other Yezidi regiments led by Sardar Bey, Najid Bey, Osman Agha and Hussein Bey went over to the side of the Russians. 

During the Armenian-Turkish battles in 1918 he greatly helped in the Armenian victory over the Turks and Sunni Kurds in the village of Molabalzet. Agha participated in the Battle of Bash Abaran, which took place on May 16-18, 1918, with his Yazidi battalion of three hundred horsemen against the Turkish Army, which had invaded Armenia. 

He welcomed the establishment of Soviet power in Armenia in 1920. He later joined in the anti-Bolshevik revolts of February 18, 1921 and participated in battles for Yerevan.

He was arrested in 1938 during the Great Purge and died in 1943 at the age of 69 in one of the Saratov prisons. He was posthumously rehabilitated in 1959.

See also 
Yazidis in Armenia

References

External links

Armenian Yazidis
Gulag detainees
Armenian military personnel of the Turkish–Armenian War
Soviet rehabilitations
19th-century Kurdish people
20th-century Kurdish people
1870s births
1943 deaths
Year of birth uncertain